The 1883 Yale Bulldogs football team represented Yale University in the 1883 college football season. The team compiled a 9–0 record, shut out eight of nine opponents, and outscored all opponents, 540 to 2.  The team was retroactively named as the national champion by the Helms Athletic Foundation, Billingsley Report, National Championship Foundation and Parke H. Davis.

Schedule

Roster
 Rushers: Samuel Reading Bertron (4), Howard H. Knapp, F. G. Peters (4), Ray Tompkins, A. L. Farwell (4), Williams (4), Louis K. Hull, W. P. McCrorey
 Quarterback: Henry Twombly (4)
 Halfbacks: Wyllys Terry, Eugene Lamb Richards
 Back: Benjamin Wisner Bacon

References

Yale
Yale Bulldogs football seasons
College football national champions
College football undefeated seasons
Yale Bulldogs football